Roundy may refer to:

Roundy's
Roundy Crossing, Arizona
Roundy (surname)
Roundy Coughlin